Wilson Medical Center may refer to:

 UHS Wilson Medical Center in Greater Binghamton, New York, a part of United Health Services
 Wilson Medical Center (North Carolina)